Mohanarajah Gajamohan (born 1980, Sri Lanka) is Swiss-based Sri Lankan robot scientist. Gajamohan has made significant contributions to cloud robotics

 by being the chief developer of Rapyuta robot database.
His other notable project being Cubli self-balancing cube.

References

External links
 Cubli demo The YouTube video has over 11 million views

Sri Lankan Tamil people
1980 births
ETH Zurich alumni
Living people
Swiss people of Sri Lankan descent